Lu Zaw is a 1978 Burmese black-and-white drama film, directed by Zaw Htet starring Kawleikgyin Ne Win, Kyaw Hein, Kyi Kyi Htay, Swe Zin Htaik and Myint Naing.

Cast
Kawleikgyin Ne Win as U Win Lwin
Kyaw Hein as Lu Zaw
Kyi Kyi Htay as Daw Tin Tin Kyi
Swe Zin Htaik as Khaing
Myint Naing as U Thet Nyunt
Min Zaw as Mya Kyaw
Toe Toe Lwin as Pan Hla
Saw Naing as Hla Myint

Award

References

1978 films
1970s Burmese-language films
Films shot in Myanmar
Burmese black-and-white films
1978 drama films
Burmese drama films